Brian Cunningham may refer to:
 Brian Cunningham (footballer) (born 1952), Australian rules footballer
 Brian Cunningham (hurler) (born 1970), Irish hurler
 Brian T. Cunningham, American engineer

See also
 Bryan Cunningham,soccer coach